Antonino "Tony" Gallardo Calixto (born May 10, 1954) is a Filipino businessman and politician. He currently serves as a member of the Philippine House of Representatives representing the Lone District of Pasay. He previously served as mayor of Pasay from 2010 until 2019, vice mayor from 2001 to 2010, and councilor from 1995 to 2001.

Early life and education
Antonino Calixto was born on May 10, 1954 in Pasay. He completed his elementary and high school education at Malate Catholic School. He earned his Bachelor of Science degree in Commerce, major in Marketing at San Sebastian College - Recoletos. After completing his undergraduate studies, he took over their family business as its vice president and general manager.

Political career

Councilor of Pasay (1995–2001) 
Calixto was elected as councilor of Pasay from its 1st district in 1995. He was reelected in 1998. He earned the highest number of votes in both elections.

Vice Mayor of Pasay (2001–2010) 
In 2001, he was elected Vice Mayor and served for three consecutive terms under former Mayor and his political ally Wenceslao Trinidad. He also served in the Pasay Anti-Drug Council, as vice chairman of the Association of Metro Manila Anti-Drug Abuse Council, and as the public relations officer and a member of the board of directors of the Vice Mayors' League of the Philippines, National Capital Region.

Mayor of Pasay (2010–2019) 
On May 10, 2010, Calixto ran as Mayor, defeating other prominent candidates including Mayor Wenceslao Trinidad, former Representative Ma. Consuelo "Tita Connie" Dy, and Ricardo "Ding" Santos, former security aide of former Mayor Pablo Cuneta. He was elected as mayor in the 2010 Pasay local elections. He was re-elected in 2013 and 2016.

Under Calixto's term, the Pasay local government was awarded first in Government Efficiency by the Department of Trade and Industry in 2018.

Representative, Lone District of Pasay (2019–present) 
On May 13, 2019, he was elected representative in the 2019 Pasay local elections, succeeding his sister Emi Calixto-Rubiano, who was elected as his successor as mayor. He was re-elected in 2022.

He is one of the 70 lawmakers who voted (representing Malabon Rep. Josephine Lacson-Noel) to reject the franchise renewal of ABS-CBN.

Personal life 
Calixto is the son of former Pasay OIC-Mayor Eduardo Calixto and Leonora Gallardo Calixto. He is the older brother of Mayor Imelda Calixto-Rubiano and uncle of District 2 Councilor Jose Isidro Jr. Calixto married Edna Dayrit Aguas, with whom he has three children: Mark Anthony (incumbent councilor from the 1st district), Derek, and Charlene.

He obtained his early education from Malate Catholic School and obtained his Bachelor of Science in Commerce, major in marketing from San Sebastian College.

On September 8, 2021, Calixto tested positive for COVID-19.

References 

Living people
PDP–Laban politicians
Members of the House of Representatives of the Philippines from Pasay
1954 births
People from Pasay
Filipino Roman Catholics
20th-century Filipino businesspeople
21st-century Filipino businesspeople